The 1950 Wisconsin Badgers baseball team is a baseball team that represented the University of Wisconsin in the 1950 NCAA baseball season. The Badgers were members of the Big Nine Conference and played their home games at Guy Lowman Field in Madison, Wisconsin. They were led by eleventh-year head coach Arthur Mansfield.

Roster

Schedule 

! style="" | Regular Season
|- valign="top" 

|- align="center" bgcolor="#ffcccc"
| 1 || April 1 || at Bradley || Unknown • Peoria, Illinois || 7–8 || 0–1 || –
|- align="center" bgcolor="#ccffcc"
| 2 || April 1 || at Bradley || Unknown • Peoria, Illinois || 10–5 || 1–1 || –
|- align="center" bgcolor="#ccffcc"
| 3 || April  || vs  || Unknown • Unknown || 7–5 || 2–1 || –
|- align="center" bgcolor="#ccffcc"
| 4 || April  || vs  || Unknown • Unknown || 8–1 || 3–1 || –
|- align="center" bgcolor="#ffcccc"
| 5 || April  || vs  || Unknown • Unknown || 1–7 || 3–2 || –
|- align="center" bgcolor="#ccffcc"
| 6 || April 21 ||  || Guy Lowman Field • Madison, Wisconsin || 11–5 || 4–2 || 1–0
|- align="center" bgcolor="#ffcccc"
| 7 || April 22 || Ohio State || Guy Lowman Field • Madison, Wisconsin || 7–9 || 4–3 || 1–1
|- align="center" bgcolor="#ccffcc"
| 8 || April  || vs  || Unknown • Unknown || 13–6 || 5–3 || 2–1
|- align="center" bgcolor="#ccffcc"
| 9 || April  || vs Northwestern || Unknown • Unknown || 4–2 || 6–3 || 3–1
|- align="center" bgcolor="#ccffcc"
| 10 || April  || vs Appleton Papermakers || Unknown • Unknown || 19–5 || 7–3 || 3–1
|-

|- align="center" bgcolor="#ccffcc"
| 11 || May 5 || at  || Lambert Field • West Lafayette, Indiana || 5–0 || 8–3 || 4–1
|- align="center" bgcolor="#ffcccc"
| 12 || May 6 || at Purdue || Lambert Field • West Lafayette, Indiana || 1–6 || 8–4 || 4–2
|- align="center" bgcolor="#ffcccc"
| 13 || May 10 ||  || Guy Lowman Field • Madison, Wisconsin || 5–10 || 8–5 || 4–2
|- align="center" bgcolor="#ffcccc"
| 14 || May 11 || Notre Dame || Guy Lowman Field • Madison, Wisconsin || 5–14 || 8–6 || 4–2
|- align="center" bgcolor="#ccffcc"
| 15 || May  || vs  || Unknown • Unknown || 6–5 || 9–6 || 5–2
|- align="center" bgcolor="#ffcccc"
| 16 || May  || vs Iowa || Unknown • Unknown || 4–9 || 9–7 || 5–3
|- align="center" bgcolor="#ccffcc"
| 17 || May 19 || vs  || Unknown • Unknown || 4–3 || 10–7 || 6–3
|- align="center" bgcolor="#ccffcc"
| 18 || May 20 || vs Michigan || Unknown • Unknown || 7–6 || 11–7 || 7–3
|- align="center" bgcolor="#ccffcc"
| 19 || May 22 || Bradley || Guy Lowman Field • Madison, Wisconsin || 6–4 || 12–7 || 7–3
|- align="center" bgcolor="#ccffcc"
| 20 || May 25 || vs  || Unknown • Unknown || 13–7 || 13–7 || 7–3
|- align="center" bgcolor="#ccffcc"
| 21 || May  || vs  || Unknown • Unknown || 9–8 || 14–7 || 8–3
|- align="center" bgcolor="#ccffcc"
| 22 || May  || vs Minnesota || Unknown • Unknown || 2–0 || 15–7 || 9–3
|-

|- align="center" bgcolor="#ccffcc"
| 23 || June 8 || at  || Old College Field • East Lansing, Michigan || 13–6 || 16–7 || 9–3
|- align="center" bgcolor="#ccffcc"
| 24 || June  || vs Ohio || Unknown • Unknown || 4–1 || 17–7 || 9–3
|-

|-
! style="" | Postseason
|- valign="top"

|- align="center" bgcolor="#ccffcc"
| 25 || June 15 || vs Colorado A&M || Johnny Rosenblatt Stadium • Omaha, Nebraska || 7–3 || 18–7 || 9–3
|- align="center" bgcolor="#ffcccc"
| 26 || June 17 || vs Rutgers || Johnny Rosenblatt Stadium • Omaha, Nebraska || 3–5 || 18–8 || 9–3
|- align="center" bgcolor="#ccffcc"
| 27 || June 20 || vs Alabama || Johnny Rosenblatt Stadium • Omaha, Nebraska || 3–1 || 19–8 || 9–3
|- align="center" bgcolor="#ffcccc"
| 28 || June 21 || vs Rutgers || Johnny Rosenblatt Stadium • Omaha, Nebraska || 2–13 || 19–9 || 9–3
|-

Awards and honors 
Thornton Kipper
 District IV All Star
 Second Team All-American

Red Wilson
 Third Team All-American

References 

Wisconsin
Wisconsin Badgers baseball seasons
Wisconsin Badgers baseball
College World Series seasons
Big Ten Conference baseball champion seasons